David Collier (2 October 1957 – 2021) was a Welsh professional footballer who played in the Football League for Crewe Alexandra and Shrewsbury Town as a right back.

References 

English Football League players
Watford F.C. players
1957 births
Welsh footballers
People from Colwyn Bay
Sportspeople from Conwy County Borough
Association football fullbacks
Shrewsbury Town F.C. players
Crewe Alexandra F.C. players

2021 deaths